This is a list of accredited institutions offering law courses in Uganda, .

See also

References

External links
 Tanzania Law School Rejects 250 Ugandan Lawyers
 The Structure of Legal Education in Uganda
 Partial List of Universities Accredited By The Uganda Law Council To Teach Law In Uganda

 

Uganda
Law schools
Uganda